Frank Avery (1830–1919) was a member of the Wisconsin State Senate and the Wisconsin State Assembly.

Biography
Avery was born on November 17, 1830 in Tenterden, Kent, England. He moved to Syracuse, New York in 1853 and to Baraboo, Wisconsin in April 1856.

Career
Avery was a member of the Senate from 1889 to 1892 and of the Assembly from 1887 to 1888. He was also president and a trustee of Baraboo when it was a village. Avery was a Republican.

References

External links
The Political Graveyard

1830 births
1919 deaths
People from Tenterden
English emigrants to the United States
Politicians from Syracuse, New York
People from Baraboo, Wisconsin
Mayors of places in Wisconsin
Wisconsin city council members
Republican Party Wisconsin state senators
Republican Party members of the Wisconsin State Assembly